Sachsia zurstrasseni is a species of nematode in the Diplogastridae.

References

Diplogasteria
Taxa described in 1950